Rasmus Midgett House is a historic home located at Waves, Dare County, North Carolina. It was built in four phases starting about 1855. It is a two-story, three bay, frame I-house dwelling with a two-story rear ell. It features a one-story, full width front porch. It was moved to its present location in 1937, after being knocked off its foundation. Also on the property is a family cemetery.

It was listed on the National Register of Historic Places in 2009.

References

Houses on the National Register of Historic Places in North Carolina
Houses completed in 1890
Houses in Dare County, North Carolina
National Register of Historic Places in Dare County, North Carolina